Juhasz may refer to:

People
 Antonia Juhasz, American author and political activist
 Mike Juhasz (born 1976), Canadian Football League player
 Tunde Juhasz (born 1969), Australian cricket player
 William Juhasz (1899, Budapest - 1967, New York) Hungarian-American author, cultural and religious historian

See also 
 Juhász

Hungarian-language surnames